Yosuke Ikegaya (born August 24, 1979 in Hiroshima, Japan) plays rugby union at prop for Suntory Sungoliath in the Top League. He also plays for the Japan national rugby union team.

He has currently played 3 games for Japan.

References

External links
  - Official site

1979 births
Living people
Japanese rugby union players
Rugby union props
Japan international rugby union players
Tokyo Sungoliath players